Mad for It is a British game show for children which was produced by Carlton Television broadcast on ITV from 2 September 1998 to 31 March 2000. Series 1 was hosted by former Nickelodeon presenters Mike McClean and Yiolanda Tokkallos. Series 2 was hosted by Mike McClean, Danielle Nicholls, and Nigel Mitchell. There was also a regular character called Pie Boy, played by Alex Verrey, who would go around hitting random people in the studio with flans in a manner like The Phantom Flan Flinger from Tiswas.

Games in the show
Games included were.
Stars Up Their Noses: Contestants are given 30 seconds to show their talent. The name of the game is derived from impersonation talent show Stars in Their Eyes. This competition was won at the end of the second series, by the then fifteen-year-old Katie Melua.
Box Clever: Contestants answer questions and pick a prize from a box if correct.
That's My Pet: Contestants need to guess which is their pet amongst several similar looking animals.

Much beloved of children's television, a frequent feature of Mad For It was "gunge", a green slimy goo which was regularly poured onto losing contestants and occasionally on the hosts themselves. Those who lost the games were sent to a "Dungeon of Gunge" – an enclosure directly beneath a large nose, which expelled gunge onto the hapless prisoners. In the last episode, the tables were turned and the pie boy ended up getting shoved in the dungeon.

The most notable contestant on "Mad For It" was Katie Melua, who appeared on the show when she was fifteen. She won the "Stars Up Their Noses" game after singing "Without You" by Badfinger. If she had lost the challenge, she would have been gunged.

Episode Guide

Series 1

Episode 1 (2 September 1998)
Musical guest: Five ("Everybody Get Up")
Backchat with the Bedheads
Stars Up Their Nose - Heat 1

How Far Will You Go?
That's My Pet

Episode 2 (9 September 1998)
Musical guest: Ultra ("The Right Time")
Backchat with the Bedheads
Smarty Pants
Stars Up Their Nose - Heat 2

Make It a Date

Episode 3 (16 September 1998)
Musical guest: B*Witched ("Rollercoaster")
Backchat with the Bedheads
Stars Up Their Nose - Heat 3

Make It a Date
That's My Pet

Episode 4 (23 September 1998)
Musical guest: Billie ("Girlfriend")
Backchat with the Bedheads
Sad or Bad?
Stars Up Their Nose - Semi Final 1

How Far Will You Go?

Series 2

Transmissions

References

External links
 
 
 

1998 British television series debuts
2000 British television series endings
1990s British children's television series
2000s British children's television series
1990s British game shows
2000s British game shows
British children's game shows
Carlton Television
English-language television shows
ITV children's television shows
ITV game shows
Television series by ITV Studios
Television series featuring gunge